Some Girls is a British sitcom written by Bernadette Davis that aired on BBC Three. The show stars Adelayo Adedayo, Mandeep Dhillon, Alice Felgate, Natasha Jonas, Dolly Wells, Colin Salmon, Jassa Ahluwalia and Franz Drameh. It debuted on 6 November 2012 and the first series ran for six episodes.

BBC Three announced at the end of the first series that the show would return for a second series. On 18 September 2013, they confirmed that each episode of the second series will premiere on BBC iPlayer a week before being broadcast on BBC Three. The first episode became available on iPlayer on 23 September and was broadcast on BBC Three on 30 September, with the rest of the series following that trend.
BBC Three announced in March 2014 that the show had been recommissioned for a third and final series, which aired in November and December 2014.

Synopsis

Some Girls focuses on four 16-year-old schoolgirls – their lives, loves, and mundane teenager preoccupations, including: school, boyfriends, careers and sex. They live within the same housing estate in South London, and attend the same local school, where they all play for the demoralised football team.

The chief protagonist, Viva Bennett (Adedayo), aims to "stay motivated" with her A levels, in an ambition to become a psychologist – meanwhile, she psycho-analyzes her friends. Viva lives with firefighter father Rob (Salmon), her sex-obsessed younger brother, Jamie (Nathan Bryon), and her stepmother – Anna Hitchcock (Wells), a New Zealander who is an unsympathetic PE teacher and football coach, at the girls' school – whom they call "Bitchcock".

Viva and her close friends' conversation spans history homework to their life goals.

The story (filmed over 3 years) covers the final school year of the four protagonists. The first series is set at the beginning of the new school year, when Anna reveals that she is pregnant. The second series is set a few months later, ending with the birth of the baby, and the final series is set in the summer term, concluding with the "prom" dance after which the girls all leave school.

Cast

Regular
 Adelayo Adedayo as Viva Bennett, a smart and pragmatic girl with aspirations to attend university and become a psychologist.
 Alice Felgate as Amber Dean, a pretty, dim-witted girl who has an on-and-off relationship with her boyfriend, Brandon.
 Natasha Jonas as Holli Vavasour, a tomboy with anger problems who comes from a large family of siblings.
 Mandeep Dhillon as Saz Kaur, a sarcastic and cynical maths enthusiast from a strict Sikh family who is desperate for boys to like her.
 Dolly Wells as Anna "Bitchcock" Hitchcock, Viva's New Zealander stepmother and the girls' football coach, who Viva loathes. She later gives birth to Viva's half-sister, Jellybean.
 Colin Salmon as Rob Bennett, Viva's father and Anna's partner, who is a fireman.
 Jassa Ahluwalia as Rocky, Viva's boyfriend and later fiancé.

Recurring
 Nathan Bryon as Jamie Bennett, Viva's brother and Rob's son.
 Sarah Hoare as Mel, Viva's friend who has a baby named 'Baldy'.
 Franz Drameh as Brandon Taylor, Amber's on-and-off boyfriend. He lives with his domineering mother, Martine.
 Nick Holder, later Geoffrey McGivern, as Mr Jefferies, the girls' headmaster at Greenshoots Academy.
 Justine Cain as Charlie, the leader of 'The Pretties' cheerleader clique at Greenshoots Academy and Viva, Holli, Amber and Saz's worst enemy.
 Jacob Scipio as Tyler Blaine, head boy of Greenshoots Academy who becomes Viva's boyfriend for a time.

Commentary and reaction
Some Girls has been described as: "...a comedy about the kind of girls more usually seen in worrying documentaries about inner city teens." Bernadette Davis has said: "As far as I know, there aren't any other comedies about girls of this age. Inbetweeners has shown what a rich area for comedy this age group is - but girls are very different and I thought they should have their own show."

The Daily Mirror made the first episode of Some Girls "Tuesday's must-see TV" and described the show as "Energetic, irreverent and real". The Stage online said: "the relationship between the quartet of friends is well observed and firmly rooted in recognisable, realistic emotions". Comedian Jimmy Mulville, Managing Director of Hat Trick Productions, says: "This second series of Some Girls confirms Bernadette Davis as one of the funniest writers working today. We're lucky to have her."

Episode list

Series 1 (2012)

Series 2 (2013)

Series 3 (2014)

Awards and nominations

References

External links
 
 
 
 BBC - Some Girls Series 1 Episode 1 - Draft 24.2.12 (with story days) - Script

2012 British television series debuts
2014 British television series endings
2010s British teen sitcoms
2010s high school television series
BBC television sitcoms
British high school television series
English-language television shows
Television series about dysfunctional families
Television series about teenagers
Television series by Hat Trick Productions
Television shows set in London